Thomas Schuster is a professor of economics at the Baden-Württemberg Cooperative State University Mannheim.

Education 
Thomas Schuster studied economics at the University of Mannheim and at Portsmouth Polytechnic. After receiving his diploma from the University of Mannheim, he pursued a doctorate in economics and worked as a research assistant at Mannheim Centre of Social Research and at the Faculty of Economics of Mannheim University. For his doctoral thesis he conducted a European-wide survey about social policy. He estimated the determinants of the demand for social policy using microeconometric methods. He was the first scholar who determined the demand for social policy in the member states of the European Union.

Career 
Schuster was an equity analyst at the BBBank. He worked in the research department and was in charge of making investment recommendations for the bank's customers on European and U.S. equities.

Afterwards, Schuster was deputy professor at the University of Applied Sciences, Kaiserslautern. He taught courses in statistics, economics and financial management. He also taught at several other Universities of Applied Sciences including the University of Applied Sciences in Berlin, Pforzheim and Deggendorf. Further, he regularly taught classes in Helsinki at Metropolia University of Applied Sciences and at Haaga-Helia University of Applied Sciences.

In 2013, Schuster was visiting research fellow at the Cologne Institute for Economic Research, Germany. In 2013–2014, he was a visiting professor in the faculty of business at Ningbo University in Ningbo, China. In 2014, he won the Scientific Award for the Best Internal Publication 2013 of the Cologne Institute of Economic Research.

Research 
Schuster's research interests are primarily in the fields of social policy, labour economics and international monetary policy. He researched the European Monetary Union and the euro crisis. In all of his research he has an empirical approach.

References

German economists
Living people
Academic staff of the Pforzheim University of Applied Sciences
Year of birth missing (living people)